The 1994 Purefoods Tender Juicy Hotdogs season was the seventh season of the franchise in the Philippine Basketball Association (PBA). Known as Coney Island Ice Cream Stars in the All-Filipino Cup.

Draft picks

Notable dates
March 8: The defending All-Filipino champions opened their season by hanging tough in the final 5.1 seconds to pull off a 111-109 victory over Swift. Alvin Patrimonio's lone free throw and Jerry Codiñera's block on Nelson Asaytono as the buzzer sounded save the Ice Cream Stars from a reversal after the Mighty Meaties threatened at 109-110 on rookie Boybits Victoria's three-pointer.  

April 10: Coney Island subdued San Miguel Beermen, 97-95, for their sixth win in nine games in the All-Filipino Cup. The victory moved them up close to the leading Beermen, who fell to six wins and two losses which is the same slate of surprise team Sta.Lucia Realtors.

7th straight All-Filipino finals stint
Coney Island advances to the All-Filipino Cup finals for the seventh straight year after defeating Swift in a playoff game. They battled the San Miguel Beermen for the third consecutive time for All-Filipino supremacy. The Stars lost to the Beermen in six games.

4th championship
Returning to Purefoods Tender Juicy Hotdogs in the Commissioner's Cup, the Hotdogs were reinforced by former Pepsi import Kenny Redfield. Purefoods makes it to the finals against Alaska Milkmen where the Hotdogs scored a 4-1 series victory to win their fourth PBA crown.

Awards
Alvin Patrimonio wins his third Most Valuable Player (MVP) Award, becoming the first player to win back-to-back MVPs since William "Bogs" Adornado of Crispa did it in the first two years of the PBA in 1975-1976.
Jerry Codinera and Alvin Patrimonio were named in the Mythical Team first five selection.
Kenny Redfield was voted the Commissioner's Cup Best Import.

Roster

Transactions

Trades

Subtractions
{| cellspacing="0"
| valign="top" |

Recruited imports

Win–loss record

References

Magnolia Hotshots seasons
Purefoods